The Minsk Detention Center No. 1 or SIZO No. 1 (Belarusian: СІЗА №1), informally known as Volodarka, Belarusian pronunciation: Valadarka (Валадарка), is the central prison of the Republic of Belarus located in Minsk.

Name
The prison castle is known in Belarusian as Pishchalauski Castle (Пішчалаўскі замак), also spelled Pischalauski Castle, a name derived from the landlord who built it, Rudolph Pischallo. The Russian version of the name is Pishchalovsky castle.

Its popular name, Volodarka, was coined after the October Revolution, when the street on which the building stood was renamed in honour of revolutionary leader V. Volodarsky. It is also sometimes called the Belarusian Bastille.

Current usage
Operated by the Belarusian Ministry of Internal Affairs, SIZO No. 1 is the only facility that houses death row inmates. Their execution occurs at the prison.

The prison is also used as a pre-trial detention centre where arrested political activists are held.

History

Russian Empire
The stone building was completed by 1824, and it was commissioned in spring 1825. The castle-shaped structure was purposely built as a prison by the landowner Rudolph Pischallo (also spelled Rudolf Pischalo), who entrusted architect Kazimir Khrschonovich (also spelled Casimir Hrschanovicha) with the design. The project was approved by Tsar Nicholas I himself. The main building is three stories high, flanked by four corner towers, and surrounded by the prison yard.

Inmates and executions
 Vintsent Dunin-Martsinkyevich (c. 1808–1884), Belarusian writer and social activist (imprisoned 1864-1865)
 Felix Dzerzhinsky, future leader of the Soviet secret police, here repeatedly on transfer during his arrests for "revolutionary activity"
 Alés Harun (1887–1920), Belarusian writer (imprisoned 1907)
 Karuś Kahaniec (1868–1918), Belarusian writer (imprisoned 1905-1906 & 1910-1911)
 Jakub Kołas (1882–1956), Belarusian writer (imprisoned 1908-1911)
 Józef Piłsudski (1867–1935), future Polish statesman, held here while under investigation after being arrested in 1887
 Ivan Pulikhov (Pulichaŭ; 1879-1906), revolutionary terrorist who attempted to assassinate the Minsk governor, hanged at the prison gates

Soviet Union
After the First World War, the prison was taken over by the Cheka-GPU. Famous Socialist Revolutionary Boris Savinkov, arrested after being lured back to Soviet territory as part of operation "Trust", was held here for a while in 1924.

On the night of 29/30 October 1937, during Stalin's Great Terror, NKVD officers executed 36 representatives of Belarusian culture, science and art in the castle basement, by shooting them in the head. Another 52 were executed that night in the basement of the building of the internal prison of the NKVD in Minsk near the Pishchalovsky castle. In total, during the repressions of 1937-1940, about 100 people were executed in the Pishchalovsky Castle, accused of anti-Soviet activities.

World War II
As a result of the Soviet invasion of Poland starting on September 17, 1939, a large number of Polish POWs (military, police, and civil servants) as well as Polish common criminals were imprisoned at Pishchalauski Castle. In 1940-1941, the prisoner was Ryszard Kaczorowski, later the last President of Poland-in-exile.

After the Nazi invasion of the Soviet Union, the Germans kept on using the prison as such.

During the Great Patriotic War, arrested partisans and members of the underground were kept in the Pishchalovsky Castle. Some were executed or tortured there.

Post-WWII 
In the years 1944-1945 the prisoner was Kazimierz Świątek, later a cardinal of the Roman Catholic Church.

After 1953, it was the only institution in the Byelorussian SSR where death sentences were carried out.

In chronological order of execution:
Vasyl Meleshko (1917-1975), Ukrainian participant in the Khatyn massacre (no connection to Katyn massacre)
Valery Nekhaev (1948–1983), Soviet murderer
Hryhoriy Vasiura (1915-1987), Ukrainian Red Army Lt., later POW and Nazi collaborator, who took part in the Khatyn massacre
Gennady Mikhasevich (1947-1987), Soviet serial killer

Independent Belarus
Pishchalauski Castle is a registered state architectural monument. As of 2013, it was in urgent need of major repairs, with part of one of its four towers having collapsed in April 2008. As of 2013, there were speculations that "Volodarka" might be transformed into a museum.

Opponents of Lukashenko regime
Arrested during and after the 2020 presidential campaign, which lead to the contested reelection of Alexander Lukashenko:
Andrej Aliaksandraŭ, journalist
Mikola Dziadok (born 1988), Belarusian activist; arrested for "violation of public order", etc.
Alaksandar Kabanaŭ (born 1971), аuthor of the YouTube channel "People's Reporter", associate of Sviatlana Tsikhanouskaya, charged for "violat[ing] public order"and "insulting a government official", sentenced to 3 years in prison
Maria Kalesnikava, musician, politician
Ihar Losik, blogger
Siarhiej Piatruchin, blogger
Roman Protasevich (born 1995), Belarusian activist; arrested after his flight, Ryanair Flight 4978, was diverted to Minsk for a false bomb threat
Marfa Rabkova, human rights defender
Illia Salei (born 1991), Belarusian lawyer; arrested for "threatening the national security of Belarus"
Rostislav Shavel (born 2001), Belarusian footballer; arrested for participating in a march
Yuliya Sluckaya, media manager
Aliaksandr Vasilievič, businessman
Maxim Znak (born 1981), Belarusian lawyer and politician; arrested for "conspiracy to seize state power in an unconstitutional manner" and "establishing and leading an extremist organization".
Maryna Zolatava, editor-in-chief of tut.by

Executions
In chronological order of execution:
Igor Mirenkov (1969-1996), Soviet-Belarusian serial killer
Sergey Pugachev (1972-2005), Belarusian serial killer and member of The Polotsk Four
Yuri Kurilsky (1979-2007), Belarusian serial killer
Alexander Sergeychik (1970-2007), Belarusian serial killer
Eduard Lykov (1960-2014), Russian-born Belarusian serial killer
Ivan Kulesh (1986-2016), Belarusian serial killer
Alexey Mikhalenya (1984-2018), Belarusian serial killer

See also
 Amerikanka prison in Minsk
 Capital punishment in Belarus
 Kurapaty, woods outside Minsk where a vast number of people were executed by Stalin's NKVD in 1937-1941 
 Okrestina prison in Minsk
 State Security Committee of the Republic of Belarus aka KGB of Belarus

References

External links

Belarus Castles, Palaces and historical Manors database of Belarusian State Archive 

Castles in Belarus
Buildings and structures in Minsk
Tourist attractions in Minsk
Infrastructure completed in 1825
Prisons in Belarus